Joseph Dalton (2 December 1817 – 5 January 1905) was an Irish Jesuit priest born in Waterford. He was educated at the Jesuit colleges of Clongowes Wood College and St Stanislaus College, Tullabeg and entered the Society of Jesus in December 1836. He studied and served at various Jesuit institutions in Ireland and returned to Tullabeg where he had also taught in 1839–1840 and served as Rector from 1861–1865.

He led the first Irish Jesuit mission to Australia in 1866, and was responsible for the development of a number of churches and educational institutions.  He oversaw the transfer of St Patrick's College, East Melbourne to the Jesuits and subsequently purchased land in 1872 upon which Xavier College, Kew, was built. It opened in 1878.

In Sydney, he founded  Saint Ignatius' College, Riverview & St Aloysius' College. He was Rector of  Riverview, New South Wales. After his retirement in 1883 he lived at Riverview, where he died on 5 January 1905.

The Chapel of Riverview was later erected to his memory and is known as the Dalton Memorial Chapel.

He also served in New Zealand for a time, where in 1878 he founded Saint Aloysius’ College, Dunedin.

References

1817 births
1905 deaths
19th-century Irish Jesuits
People from County Waterford
Irish Roman Catholic missionaries
People educated at Clongowes Wood College
Jesuit missionaries
Missionary educators
Roman Catholic missionaries in Australia
Roman Catholic missionaries in New Zealand
Irish expatriates in Australia
Irish expatriates in New Zealand
People educated at St Stanislaus College